Route nationale 6  (RN6) is a primary highway in Madagascar of 706 km, running from Antsiranana to Ambondromamy.  It crosses the regions of Diana and Sofia. It was paved in 1992.

Most parts of this road are paved and well maintained but there are some unpaved sections in a very bad shape.

Selected locations on route
(north to south)
Antsiranana
Tsingy Rouge
Anivorano Nord
Ankarana Reserve (Tsingy d'Ankarana) - at Mahamasina
Ambilobe - (junction with RN5a to Vohémar and Sambava)
Ambanja - (Manongarivo Reserve at 35 km from Ambanja).
Mahamanina Falls
Maromandia
Antsohihy  (junction with RN 31 to Bealanana) and RN 32 to Mandritsara)
bridge over the Sofia River.
Port Berge (Boriziny)
Mampikony
Ambondromamy- (junction with RN4 (Mahajanga - Antananarivo)

Gallery

See also
List of roads in Madagascar
Transport in Madagascar

References

Sofia Region
Roads in Diana Region
Roads in Madagascar
Roads in Boeny